This article presents a list of the historical events and publications of Australian literature during 1865.

Books 

 Ada Cambridge – The Two Surplices
 Ellen Davitt – Force and Fraud : A Tale of the Bush
 Benjamin Farjeon – Shadows on the Snow : A Christmas Story
 Maud Jeanne Franc – Emily's Choice : An Australian Tale

Short stories 

 Mary Fortune – "My Lady Jane"
 J. R. Houlding – "Mr McFaddle's Pic-nic Party"

Poetry 

 Mary Fortune – "Cooee"
 Henry Kendall
 "Daniel Henry Deniehy"
 "The Glen of the White Man's Grave" (aka "The Glen of Arrawatta")

Births 

A list, ordered by date of birth (and, if the date is either unspecified or repeated, ordered alphabetically by surname) of births in 1865 of Australian literary figures, authors of written works or literature-related individuals follows, including year of death.

 9 January – Peter Airey, politician, poet and writer (died 1950)
 11 February – Ida Lee, historian and poet (died 1943)
 4 March – Edward Dyson, poet and writer (died 1931)
 20 March – Arthur Bayldon, poet (died 1958)
 8 August – Marion Knowles, novelist, poet and journalist (died 1949)
 16 August – Mary Gilmore, poet (died 1962)
 28 August – Alfred Stephens, writer and critic (died 1933)
 21 September – Francis Kenna, politician, poet and writer (died 1932)
25 September – Agnes Littlejohn, poet and short story writer (died 1944)

Deaths 

A list, ordered by date of death (and, if the date is either unspecified or repeated, ordered alphabetically by surname) of deaths in 1865 of Australian literary figures, authors of written works or literature-related individuals follows, including year of birth.

 22 October – Daniel Henry Deniehy, politician and writer (born 1828)

See also 
 1865 in Australia
 1865 in literature
 1865 in poetry
 List of years in Australian literature
 List of years in literature

References

 
Australia
19th-century Australian literature
Australian literature by year